Columbus Airport may refer to:

Airports with commercial airline service:
John Glenn Columbus International Airport in Columbus, Ohio, United States (FAA/IATA: CMH)
Rickenbacker International Airport in Columbus, Ohio, United States (FAA/IATA: LCK)
Columbus Metropolitan Airport (Georgia) in Columbus, Georgia, United States (FAA/IATA: CSG)
Golden Triangle Regional Airport near Columbus, Mississippi, United States (FAA/IATA: GTR)

Other airports:
Columbus Airport (Montana) in Columbus, Montana, United States (FAA: 6S3)
Columbus-Lowndes County Airport, a public use airport in Columbus, Mississippi, United States (FAA/IATA: UBS)
Columbus Southwest Airport in Columbus, Ohio, United States (FAA: 04I)

See also
Columbus Municipal Airport (disambiguation)